The 2011 Vattenfall Cyclassics was the 16th edition of the Vattenfall Cyclassics, a single-day cycling race. It was the 22nd event of the 2011 UCI World Tour season.

Fresh from his victory in the Eneco Tour a week before the Cyclassics, 's Edvald Boasson Hagen – who, in 2010, was second to Tyler Farrar, who elected to compete in the concurrent Vuelta a España in 2011 – took the victory in a sprint finish out of a large group of riders, who had broken away after a split in the field.

Results

References

2011 UCI World Tour
Vattenfall
2011